"The Little Mute Boy" ("El niño mudo") is a poem by Federico García Lorca published in his Canciones (1921-1924). In the poem, Lorca tells "a story in which separation and alienation predominate, as a child's voice is missing and imprisoned in the being of another". This theme is continued in the following poem, "El niño loco" ("The Crazy Boy").

Structurally, the poem is made of three coplas in octosyllabic verses with assonant rhymes between the even verses.

In 1947, the poem, translated to French as "L'enfant muet", was adapted musically by Francis Poulenc along two others poems from the Canciones.

References

Poetry by Federico García Lorca